Beta Sagittae, Latinized from β Sagittae, is a single star in the northern constellation of Sagitta. It is a faint star but visible to the naked eye with an apparent visual magnitude of 4.38. Based upon an annual parallax shift of 7.7237 mas as seen from the Gaia satellite, it is located 420 light years from the Sun. The star is moving closer to the Sun with a radial velocity of −22 km/s.

The suffix notation indicates a mild overabundance of the cyanogen molecule in the spectrum. Beta Sagittae is an estimated 129 million years old with 4.33 times the mass of the Sun, and has expanded to roughly 27 times the Sun's radius. The star is radiating 392 times the Sun's luminosity from its enlarged photosphere at an effective temperature of 4,850 K.

Naming

References

G-type giants
Sagitta (constellation)
Sagittae, Beta
Durchmusterung objects
Sagittae, 06
185958
096837
7488